Church of the Immaculate Conception of the Blessed Virgin Mary is a Roman Catholic parish church under the authority of the Roman Catholic Archdiocese of New York, located at 150th Street at Melrose Avenue, Bronx, New York City, in the Melrose neighborhood of the South Bronx. The parish was established in 1853. It is staffed by the Redemptorist Fathers. The church boasts the highest steeple in the Bronx.

Building
The present Romanesque Revival brick church was completed in 1887 to the designs of Henry Bruns and is the highest steeple in the Bronx. The school hall was built 1901 to the designs by Anthony F. A. Schmitt. "Built in the days when Germans were the most populous ethnic group in the Bronx and their prominence in the building trades, brewing, and the manufacture of musical instruments was of central importance to the borough's prosperity."

References 

German-American culture in New York City
Religious organizations established in 1853
Roman Catholic churches completed in 1887
19th-century Roman Catholic church buildings in the United States
Roman Catholic churches in the Bronx
Redemptorist churches in the United States
Romanesque Revival church buildings in New York City
1853 establishments in New York (state)
Melrose, Bronx